The Iraq men's national under-18 basketball team is a national basketball team of Iraq, administered by the Iraqi Basketball Association.
It represents the country in international under-18 (under age 18) basketball competitions.

See also
Iraq men's national basketball team
Iraq men's national under-16 basketball team

References

External links
 Archived records of Iraq team participations

Basketball teams in Iraq
Men's national under-18 basketball teams
Basketball